Insects have a wide variety of predators, including birds, reptiles, amphibians, mammals, carnivorous plants, and other arthropods. The great majority (80–99.99%) of individuals born do not survive to reproductive age, with perhaps 50% of this mortality rate attributed to predation. In order to deal with this ongoing escapist battle, insects have evolved a wide range of defense mechanisms. The only restraint on these adaptations is that their cost, in terms of time and energy, does not exceed the benefit that they provide to the organism. The further that a feature tips the balance towards beneficial, the more likely that selection will act upon the trait, passing it down to further generations. The opposite also holds true; defenses that are too costly will have a little chance of being passed down. Examples of defenses that have withstood the test of time include hiding, escape by flight or running, and firmly holding ground to fight as well as producing chemicals and social structures that help prevent predation.

One of the best known modern examples of the role that evolution has played in insect defenses is the link between melanism and the peppered moth (Biston betularia). Peppered moth evolution over the past two centuries in England has taken place, with darker morphs becoming more prevalent over lighter morphs so as to reduce the risk of predation. However, its underlying mechanism is still debated.

Hiding

Walking sticks (order Phasmatodea), many katydid species (family Tettigoniidae), and moths (order Lepidoptera) are just a few of the insects that have evolved specialized cryptic morphology. This adaptation allows them to hide within their environment because of a resemblance to the general background or an inedible object. When an insect looks like an inedible or inconsequential object in the environment that is of no interest to a predator, such as leaves and twigs, it is said to display mimesis, a form of crypsis.

Insects may also take on different types of camouflage, another type of cypsis. These include resembling a uniformly colored background as well as being light below and dark above, or countershaded. Additionally, camouflage is effective when it results in patterns or unique morphologies that disrupt outlines so as to better merge the individual into the background.

Cost and benefit perspective
Butterflies (order Lepidoptera) are a good example of the balancing act between the costs and benefits associated with defense. This energy is derived both internally through muscles and externally through picking up solar radiation through the body or wings. When looked at in this light, cryptic coloration to escape from predators, markings to attract conspecifics or warn predators (aposematism), and the absence of color to absorb adequate solar radiation, all play key roles in survival. Only when these three affairs are in balance does the butterfly maximize its fitness.

Mimicry

Mimicry is a form of defense which describes when a species resembles another recognized by natural enemies, giving it protection against predators. The resemblance among mimics does not denote common ancestry. Mimicry works if and only if predators are able to learn from eating distasteful species. It is a three part system that involves a model species, a mimic of that species, and a predatory observer that acts as a selective agent. If learning is to be successful, then all models, mimics, and predators must co-exist, a notion feasible within the context of geographic sympatry.

Mimicry is divided into two parts, Batesian mimicry and Müllerian mimicry.

Batesian mimicry

In Batesian mimicry, an aposematic inedible model has an edible mimic. Automimics are individuals that, due to environmental conditions, lack the distasteful or harmful chemicals of conspecifics, but are still indirectly protected through their visibly identical relatives. An example can be found in the plain tiger (Danaus chrysippus), a non-edible butterfly, which is mimicked by multiple species, the most similar being the female danaid eggfly (Hypolimnas misippus).

Müllerian mimicry

In Müllerian mimicry, a group of species benefit from each other's existence because they all are warningly colored in the same manner and are distasteful. The best examples of this phenomenon can be found within the butterfly genus Heliconius. Like in Batesian mimicry, the mimics are not closely related, although they obviously are in Heliconius.

Behavioral responses
Behavioral responses to escape predation include burrowing into substrate and being active only through part of the day. Furthermore, insects may feign death, a response termed thanatosis. Beetles, particularly weevils, do this frequently. Bright colors may also be flashed underneath cryptic ones. A startle display occurs when prey takes advantage of these markings after being discovered by a predator. The striking color pattern, which often includes eyespots, is intended to evoke prompt enemy retreat. Better formed eyespots seem to result in better deterrence.

Mechanical defenses
Insects have had millions of years to evolve mechanical defenses. Perhaps the most obvious is the cuticle. Although its main role lies in support and muscle attachment, when extensively hardened by the cross-linking of proteins and chitin, or sclerotized, the cuticle acts as a first line of defense. Additional physical defenses include modified mandibles, horns, and spines on the tibia and femur. When these spines take on a main predatory role, they are termed raptorial.

Some insects uniquely create retreats that appear uninteresting or inedible to predators. This is the case in caddisfly larvae (order Trichoptera) which encase their abdomen with a mixture of materials like leaves, twigs, and stones.

Autotomy

Autotomy, or the shedding of appendages, is also used to distract predators, giving the prey a chance to escape. This highly costly mechanism is regularly practiced within stick insects (order Phasmatodea) where the cost is accentuated by the possibility that legs can be lost 20% of the time during molting. Harvestmen (order Opiliones) also use autotomy as a first line of defense against predators.

Chemical defenses
Unlike pheromones, allomones harm the receiver at the benefit of the producer. This grouping encompasses the chemical arsenal that numerous insects employ. Insects with chemical weaponry usually make their presence known through aposematism. Aposematism is utilized by non-palatable species as a warning to predators that they represent a toxic danger. Additionally, these insects tend to be relatively large, long-lived, active, and frequently aggregate. Indeed, longer-lived insects are more likely to be chemically defended than short lived ones, as longevity increases apparency.

Throughout the arthropod and insect realm, however, chemical defenses are quite unevenly distributed. There is great variation in the presence and absence of chemical arms among orders and families to even within families. Moreover, there is diversity among insects as to whether the defensive compounds are obtained intrinsically or extrinsically. Many compounds are derived from the main food source of insect larvae, and occasionally adults, feed, whereas other insects are able to synthesize their own toxins.

In reflex bleeding, insects dispel their blood, hemolymph, or a mixture of exocrine secretions and blood as a defensive maneuver. As previously mentioned, the discharged blood may contain toxins produced within the insect source or externally from plants that the insect consumed. Reflexive bleeding occurs in specific parts of the body; for example, the beetle families Coccinellidae (ladybugs) and Meloidae bleed from the knee joints.

Classification
Gullan and Cranston  have divided chemical defenses into two classes. Class I chemicals irritate, injure, poison, or drug individual predators. They can be further separated into immediate or delayed substances, depending on the amount of time it takes to feel their effects. Immediate substances are encountered topographically when a predator handles the insect while delayed chemicals, which are generally contained within the insect's tissues, induce vomiting and blistering. Class I chemicals include bufadienolides, cantharidin, cyanides, cardenolides, and alkaloids, all of which have greater effects on vertebrates than on other arthropods. The most frequently encountered defensive compounds in insects are alkaloids.

In contrast to Class I chemicals, Class II chemicals are essentially harmless. They stimulate scent and taste receptors so as to discourage feeding. They tend to have low molecular weight and are volatile and reactive, including acids, aldehydes, aromatic ketones, quinones, and terpenes. Furthermore, they may be aposematic, indicating through odors the presence of chemical defenses. The two different classes are not mutually exclusive, and insects may use combinations of the two.

Pasteels, Grégoire, and Rowell-Rahier  also grouped chemical defenses, albeit in a different manner. Weaponry is partitioned into chemical compounds that are truly poisonous, those that restrict movement, and those that repel predators. True poisons, essentially Class I compounds, interfere with specific physiological processes or act at certain sites. Repellents are similar to those classified under Class II as they irritate the chemical sensitivity of predators. Impairment of movement and sense organs is achieved through sticky, slimy, or entangling secretions that act mechanically rather than chemically. This last grouping of chemicals has both Class I and Class II properties. As with Class I and Class II compounds, these three categories are not mutually exclusive, as some chemicals can have multiple effects.

Examples

Assassin bugs
When startled, the assassin bug Platymeris rhadamanthus (family Reduviidae), is capable of spitting venom up to 30 cm at potential threats. The saliva of this insect contains at least six proteins including large amounts of protease, hyaluronidase, and phospholipase which are known to cause intense local pain, vasodilation, and edema.

Cockroaches
Many cockroach species (order Blattodea) have mucus-like adhesive secretions on their posterior. Although not as effective against vertebrates, these secretions foul the mouths of invertebrate predators, increasing the chances of the cockroach escaping.

Termites
The majority of termite soldiers secrete a rubberlike and sticky chemical concoction that serves to entangle enemies, called a fontanellar gun, and it is usually coupled with specialized mandibles. In nasute species of termites (contained within the subfamily Nasutitermitinae), the mandibles have receded. This makes way for an elongated, syringic nasus capable of squirting liquid glue. When this substance is released from the frontal gland reservoir and dries, it becomes sticky and is capable of immobilizing attackers. It is highly effective against other arthropods, including spiders, ants, and centipedes.

Among termite species in the Apicotermitinae that are soldierless or where soldiers are rare, mouth secretions are commonly replaced by abdominal dehiscence. These termites contract their abdominal muscles, resulting in the fracturing of the abdominal wall and the expulsion of gut contents. Because abdominal dehiscence is quite effective at killing ants, the noxious chemical substance released is likely contained within the termite itself.

Ants
Venom is the defense of choice for many ants (family Formicidae). It is injected from an ovipositor that has been evolutionarily modified into a stinging apparatus. These ants release a complex venom mixture that can include histamine. Within the subfamily Formicinae, the stinger has been lost and instead the poison gland forcibly ejects the fluid of choice, formic acid. Some carpenter ants (genus Camponotus) also have mandibular glands that extend throughout their bodies. When these are mechanically irritated, the ant commits suicide by exploding, spilling out a sticky, entangling substance.

The subfamily Dolichoderinae, which also does not possess a stinger, has a different type of defense. The anal gland secretions of this group rapidly polymerize in air and serve to immobilize predators.

Leaf beetles
Leaf beetles produce a spectrum of chemicals for their protection from predators. In the case of the subtribe Chrysomelina (Chrysomelinae), all live stages are protected by the occurrence of isoxazolin-5-one derived glucosides that partially contain esters of 3-nitropropanoic acid (3-NPA, beta-nitropropionic acid). The latter compound is an irreversible inhibitor of succinate dehydrogenase. Hence, 3-NPA inhibits the tricarboxylic acid cycle. This inhibition leads to neurodegeneration with symptoms similar to those caused by Huntington's disease.  Since leaf beetles produce high concentrations of 3-NPA esters, a powerful chemical defense against a wide range of different predators is obvious. The larvae of Chrysomelina leaf beetles developed a second defensive strategy that is based on the excretion of droplets via pairs of defensive glands at the back of the insects. These droplets are immediately presented after mechanical disturbance and contain volatile compounds that derive from sequestered plant metabolites. Due to the specialization of leaf beetles to a certain host plant, the composition of the larval secretion is species-dependent. For instance, the red poplar leaf beetle (Chrysomela populi) consumes the leaves of poplar plants, which contain salicin. This compound is taken up by the insect and then further transformed biochemically into salicylaldehyde, an odor very similar to benzaldehyde. The presence of salicin and salicylaldehyde can repel potential predators of leaf beetles.
The hemolymph toxins originate from autogenous de novo biosynthesis by the Chrysomelina beetle. Essential amino acids, such as valine serve as precursors for the production of the hemolymph toxins of Chrysomelina leaf beetles. The degradation of such essential amino acids provides propanoyl-CoA. This compound is further transformed into propanoic acid and β-alanine. The amino group in β-alanine is then oxidized to yield either an oxime or the nitro-toxin 3-nitropropanoic acid (3-NPA). The oxime is cyclized to isoxazolin-5-one, which is transformed with α-UDP-glucose into the isoxazolin-5-one glucoside. In a final step, an ester is formed by transesterification of 3-nitropropanoyl-CoA to the 6´-position of isoxazolin-5-one glucoside. This biosynthetic route yields high millimolar concentrations of the secondary isoxazolin-5-one and 3-NPA derived metabolites. Free 3-NPA and glucosides that derive from 3-NPA and isoxazolin-5-one also occur in many genera of leguminous plants (Fabaceae).

The larvae of leaf beetles from the subfamilies of e.g., Criocerinae and Galerucinae often employ fecal shields, masses of feces that they carry on their bodies to repel predators. More than just a physical barrier, the fecal shield contains excreted plant volatiles that can serve as potent predator deterrents.

Wasps
Ant attacks represent a large predatory pressure for many species of wasps, including the Polistes versicolor. These wasps possess a gland located in the VI abdominal sternite (van de Vecht's gland) that is primarily responsible for making an ant-repellent substance. Tufts of hair near the edge of the VI abdominal sternite store and apply the ant repellent, secreting the ant repellent through a rubbing behavior.

Collective defenses in social insects
Many chemically defended insect species take advantage of clustering over solitary confinement. Among some insect larvae in the orders Coleoptera and Hymenoptera, cycloalexy is adopted. Either the heads or ends of the abdomen, depending on where noxious compounds are secreted, make up the circumference of a circle. The remaining larvae lie inside this defensive ring where the defenders repel predators through threatening attitudes, regurgitation, and biting.

Termites (order Isoptera), like eusocial ants, wasps, and bees, rely on a caste system to protect their nests. The evolution of fortress defense is closely linked to the specialization of soldier mandibles. Soldiers can have biting-crushing, biting-cutting, cutting, symmetrical snapping, and asymmetrical snapping mandibles. These mandibles may be paired with frontal gland secretion, although snapping soldiers rarely utilize chemical defenses. Termites take advantage of their modified mandibles in phragmosis, which is the blocking of the nest with any part of the body; in this case of termites, nest entrances are blocked by the heads of soldiers.

Some species of bee, mainly that of the genus Trigona, also exhibit such aggressive behavior. The Trigona fuscipennis species in particular, make use of attraction, landing, buzzing and angular flights as typical alarm behaviors. But biting is the prominent form of defense among T. fuscipennis bees and involve their strong, sharp five-toothed mandibles. T. fuscipennis bees have been discovered to engage in suicidal biting in order to defend the nest and against predators. Humans standing in the vicinity of nests are almost always attacked and experience painful bites. The bees also crawl over the intruder into the ears, eye, mouth, and other cavities. The Trigona workers give a painful and persistent bite, are difficult to remove, and usually die during the attack.

Alarm pheromones warn members of a species of approaching danger. Because of their altruistic nature, they follow the rules of kin selection. They can elicit both aggregational and dispersive responses in social insects depending on the alarm caller's location relative to the nest. Closer to the nest, it causes social insects to aggregate and may subsequently produce an attack against the threat. The Polistes canadensis, a primitively eusocial wasp, will emit a chemical alarm substance at the approach of a predator, which will lower their nestmates' thresholds for attack, and even attract more nestmates to the alarm. The colony is thus able to rise quickly with its sting chambers open to defend its nest against predators. In nonsocial insects, these compounds typically stimulate dispersal regardless of location. Chemical alarm systems are best developed in aphids and treehoppers (family Membracidae) among the nonsocial groups. Alarm pheromones take on a variety of compositions, ranging from terpenoids in aphids and termites to acetates, an alcohol, and a ketone in honey bees to formic acid and terpenoids in ants.

Immunity
Insects, like nearly every other organism, are subject to infectious diseases caused by viruses, bacteria, fungi, protozoa, and nematodes. These encounters can kill or weaken the insect. Insects protect themselves against these detrimental microorganisms in two ways. Firstly, the body-enveloping chitin cuticle, in conjunction with the tracheal system and the gut lining, serve as major physical barriers to entry. Secondly, hemolymph itself plays a key role in repairing external wounds as well as destroying foreign organisms within the body cavity. Insects, along with having passive immunity, also show evidence of acquired immunity.

Social insects additionally have a repertoire of behavioural and chemical "border-defences" and in the case of the ant, groom venom or metapleural gland secretions over their cuticle.

Role of phenotypic plasticity

Phenotypic plasticity is the capacity of a single genotype to exhibit a range of phenotypes in response to variation in the environment. For example, in Nemoria arizonaria caterpillars, the cryptic pattern changes according to season and is triggered by dietary cues. In the spring, the first brood of caterpillars resembles oak catkins, or flowers. By the summer when the catkins have fallen, the caterpillars discreetly mimic oak twigs. No intermediate forms are present in this species, although other members of the genus Nemoria, such as N. darwiniata, do exhibit transitional forms.

In social insects such as ants and termites, members of different castes develop different phenotypes. For example, workers are normally smaller with less pronounced mandibles than soldiers. This type of plasticity is more so determined by cues, which tend to be non-harmful stimuli, than by the environment.

Phenotypic plasticity is important because it allows an individual to adapt to a changing environment and can ultimately alter their evolutionary path. It not only plays an indirect role in defense as individuals prepare themselves physically to take on the task of avoiding predation through camouflage or developing collective mechanical traits to protect a social hive, but also a direct one. For example, cues elicited from a predator, which may be visual, acoustic, chemical, or vibrational, may cause rapid responses that alter the prey’s phenotype in real time.

See also

 Insect ecology
 Antipredator adaptation
 Behavioral ecology

References

Exploding animals
Insect ecology
Mimicry